is a Japanese manga series written by Kazuma Kamachi and illustrated by Motoi Fuyukawa, which began serialization in the April 2007 issue of ASCII Media Works' Dengeki Daioh magazine. The manga is a spin-off of Kamachi's A Certain Magical Index light novel series, taking place before and during the events of the main story. Seven Seas Entertainment began publishing the series in North America in June 2011. An anime television series adaptation by J.C.Staff aired in Japan between October 2009 and March 2010, followed by an original video animation released in October 2010. A second season titled A Certain Scientific Railgun S aired between April and September 2013. A spin-off manga series titled A Certain Scientific Railgun: Astral Buddy began serialization in Dengeki Daioh from April 2017 to July 2020. A third season titled A Certain Scientific Railgun T aired between January and September 2020.

Plot

In the futuristic Academy City, which is made up of 80% students, many of whom are espers possessing unique psychic powers, Mikoto Misaka is an electromaster who is the third strongest of a mere seven espers who have been given the rank of Level 5. The series focuses on the exploits of Mikoto and her friends; Kuroko Shirai, Kazari Uiharu, and Ruiko Saten, prior to and during the events of A Certain Magical Index.

Media

Manga

A Certain Scientific Railgun is illustrated by Motoi Fuyukawa and started serialization in the April 2007 issue of ASCII Media Works' Dengeki Daioh. The first volume was released on November 10, 2007 and as of February 26, 2022, 17 volumes have been published. North American publisher Seven Seas Entertainment began distributing the Railgun manga from June 2011.

Anime

A 24-episode anime television series adaptation that was produced by J.C. Staff and directed by Tatsuyuki Nagai aired in Japan between October 3, 2009 and March 20, 2010. The anime was collected into eight DVD and Blu-ray Disc sets released between January 29 and August 27, 2010, with each volume containing a short story series titled A Certain Magical Index: Kanzaki SS. The series was licensed in North America by Funimation, who released the series on DVD on April 16, 2013. A bonus episode was included with a visual book released on July 24, 2010, and an original video animation (OVA) was released in Japan on October 29, 2010.

A 24-episode second season, also directed by Nagai, titled A Certain Scientific Railgun S, aired in Japan between April 12 and September 27, 2013. It was simulcast by Funimation, who released the series on DVD in North America in two parts on July 1, 2014 and August 19, 2014, respectively. Another bonus episode was released with a visual book released on March 27, 2014.

A third season titled A Certain Scientific Railgun T aired from January 10 to September 25, 2020.  The third season ran for 25 episodes.  Two bonus anime are set to be released from the third season's first and fifth Blu-Ray/DVD volumes. Unlike previous seasons, the season was simulcasted on both Funimation and Crunchyroll, with Crunchyroll streaming the series in Japanese with English subtitles, and Funimation streaming the English dub. The three seasons, including the OVA, were released on Hulu in Japan on March 24, 2022.

Music

The anime adaptation of A Certain Scientific Railgun has five pieces of theme music, two opening themes and three ending themes. The song "Smile (You & Me)" by Elisa, which uses the same tune as "Dear My Friend (Mada Minu Mirai e)", is featured as the ending theme for episode twelve. The second opening theme is "Level 5 Judgelight" by fripSide and the third ending theme is "Real Force" by Elisa. "Only My Railgun" appears in Konami's arcade music games Pop'n Music 20: Fantasia, Dance Dance Revolution X2 and Jubeat Knit. For the OVA, the opening theme music is "Future Gazer" by fripSide, the single of which was released on October 13, 2010, while the ending theme is "Special One" by Elisa, the single of which was released on October 27, 2010. The opening theme for the A Certain Scientific Railgun PSP game is "Way to answer" by fripSide.

For A Certain Scientific Railgun S, it has six pieces of theme music, two opening themes and four ending themes. The first opening theme is "Sister's Noise" by fripSide and the first ending theme is "Grow Slowly" by Yuka Iguchi, the latter of which was released on May 15, 2013. The song "stand still" by Iguchi is featured as the second ending theme for episodes 11 and 14. The second opening theme is "Eternal Reality" by fripSide and the third ending theme is "Links" by Sachika Misawa. The song "Infinia" by Misawa is featured as the fourth ending theme for episode 23.

For A Certain Scientific Railgun T, the first opening theme is "final phase" by fripSide and the first ending theme is "nameless story" by Kishida Kyoudan & The Akeboshi Rockets. The second opening theme is "dual existence" by fripSide, and the second ending theme is "Aoarashi no Ato de" (lit. "After the summer storm") by sajou no hana.

Video games

A visual novel based on A Certain Scientific Railgun for the PSP was released on December 8, 2011 after facing several delays, and comes in a special edition which includes a Kuroko Shirai Figma figure. Fuji Shoji released a pachinko based on the series, titled A Certain Scientific Railgun P, on January 24, 2022.

Light novel
A light novel consisting of four stories about Mikoto, Kuroko, Kazari, and Ruiko was released in Japan on June 10, 2022. It is written by Kamachi and illustrated by Kiyotaka Haimura, Fuyukawa, Chuya Kogino, Arata Yamaji, Yasuhito Nogi, Teto Tachitsu, and Nankyoku Kisaragi.

Reception
Four manga volumes distributed by Seven Seas Entertainment have been featured on The New York Times manga bestsellers list, with the most frequently listed (A Certain Scientific Railgun vol. 7) staying on the list for 4 weeks. 

The opening theme music for the first season of  A Certain Scientific Railgun, "Only My Railgun", won Best Theme Song at the 2010 Animation Kobe Awards. In September 2020, the anime series garnered over 300 million views in China through the Chinese streaming platform Bilibili.

Nicoletta Christina Browne of THEM Anime Reviews had mixed feelings on the first season of the series. Comparing the series to Aoi Hana, Bodacious Space Pirates, and Inari Kon Kon, she criticized the relationships between the characters but praised the narrative it adds to the Index franchise.

Notes

References

External links
A Certain Scientific Railgun official website 
A Certain Scientific Railgun at Funimation

A Certain Magical Index
2007 manga
2009 anime television series debuts
2010 anime OVAs
2013 anime television series debuts
2020 anime television series debuts
Adventure anime and manga
Anime series based on manga
ASCII Media Works games
ASCII Media Works manga
Dengeki Daioh
Fiction about psychic powers
Funimation
Japan-exclusive video games
J.C.Staff
Kadokawa Dwango franchises
NBCUniversal Entertainment Japan
PlayStation Portable games
PlayStation Portable-only games
Science fiction anime and manga
Seven Seas Entertainment titles
Shōnen manga
Video games developed in Japan
Works published under a pseudonym
Muse Communication